The 2021 Nova Scotia general election was held on August 17, 2021, to elect members to the 64th General Assembly of Nova Scotia.

In April 2019, the Electoral Boundaries Commission released its final report entitled, Balancing Effective Representation with Voter Parity. The report recommended increasing the number of electoral districts from 51 to 55, including reinstating the four former districts of Argyle, Clare, Preston and Richmond. In the fourth quarter of 2019, the House of Assembly passed the recommended electoral changes into law and they were put into effect in this election.

In a major upset, Tim Houston led the Progressive Conservatives to power for the first time since 2006, and with a majority government for the first time since 1999. With a popular vote share of 38.44%, the PCs won the smallest winning vote share of any majority government in Nova Scotian electoral history.

Elizabeth Smith-McCrossin’s victory in Cumberland North marked the first occasion since 1988 that an independent candidate won election to the House of Assembly. A record number of four Black Nova Scotians were elected MLAs; prior to this election, only five Black MLAs had ever been elected in Nova Scotia.

Timeline

 May 30, 2017 – The Liberal Party, led by Stephen McNeil, wins the 2017 Nova Scotia general election, the Progressive Conservative Association stay as the official opposition, and the New Democratic Party remain at third party status.
January 24, 2018 - Jamie Baillie resigns as leader of the Progressive Conservative Association, and MLA Karla MacFarlane becomes interim leader.
October 27, 2018 - Tim Houston is elected leader of the Progressive Conservative Association.
August 6, 2020 - Premier Stephen McNeil announces he will resign as leader of the Liberal Party and as Premier of Nova Scotia in early 2021.
February 6, 2021 - Iain Rankin is elected as leader of the Liberal Party.
February 23, 2021 - Iain Rankin is officially sworn in as the 29th Premier of Nova Scotia.
July 17, 2021 - Premier Iain Rankin calls a general election for August 17, 2021.

Leaders' debates

Results

Results by party

Results by region

Synopsis of results

Summary analysis

Incumbents not running for reelection
The following MLAs announced that they would not run in the 2021 general election:

Independent
Hugh MacKay (Chester-St. Margaret's)
Liberal Party
Karen Casey (Colchester North)
Keith Colwell (Preston-Dartmouth)
Lena Diab (Halifax Armdale)
Mark Furey (Lunenburg West)
Leo Glavine (Kings West)
Bill Horne (Waverley-Fall River-Beaver Bank)
Geoff MacLellan (Glace Bay)
Chuck Porter (Hants West)
Gordon Wilson (Clare-Digby)

New Democratic Party
Lisa Roberts (Halifax Needham)

Candidates by constituency

Legend
bold denotes party leader
† denotes an incumbent who is not running for re-election or was defeated in nomination contest

NOTE: Candidates' names are as registered with Elections Nova Scotia

Annapolis Valley

|-
|bgcolor=whitesmoke|Annapolis
||
|Carman Kerr4,23149.62%
|
|Jennifer Ehrenfeld-Poole2,75332.29%
|
|Cheryl Burbidge1,12713.22%
|
|Krista Grear3063.59%
|
|Mark Robertson1091.28%
||
|Vacant
|-
|bgcolor=whitesmoke|Clare
||
|Ronnie LeBlanc2,32249.89%
|
|Carl Deveau2,02143.43%
|
|Cameron Pye1533.29%
|
|Claire McDonald1583.39%
|
| 
||
|Gordon Wilson† Clare-Digby
|-
|bgcolor=whitesmoke|Digby-Annapolis
|
|Jimmy MacAlpine1,86535.06%
||
|Jill Balser2,63649.55%
|
|Michael Carty62611.77%
|
|Jessica Walker1132.12%
|
|Tyler Ducharme801.50%
|
|New riding
|-
|bgcolor=whitesmoke|Hants West
|
|Brian Casey3,82741.58%
||
|Melissa Sheehy-Richard3,96843.11%
|
|Caet Moir1,01511.03%
|
|Jenn Kang2732.97%
|
|Gordon J. Berry1211.31%
||
|Chuck Porter†
|-
|bgcolor=whitesmoke|Kings North
|
|Geof Turner2,60229.29%
||
|John Lohr3,97144.70%
|
|Erin Patterson1,87621.12%
|
|Doug Hickman3914.40%
|
|Paul Dunn430.48%
||
|John Lohr
|-
|bgcolor=whitesmoke|Kings South
||
|Keith Irving4,04944.11%
|
|Derrick Kimball3,04633.18%
|
|Mercedes Brian1,80819.70%
|
|Barry Leslie2763.01%
|
|
||
|Keith Irving
|-
|bgcolor=whitesmoke|Kings West
|
|Emily Lutz3,85641.52%
||
|Chris Palmer4,59249.45%
|
|Jason Langille5495.91%
|
|Sue Earle2162.33%
|
|Rick Mehta740.80%
||
|Leo Glavine†
|}

South Shore

|-
|bgcolor=whitesmoke|Argyle
|
|Nick d'Entremont63514.33%
||
|Colton LeBlanc3,64982.35%
|
|Robin Smith631.42%
|
|Corey Clamp841.90%
|
|
||
|Colton LeBlancArgyle-Barrington
|-
|bgcolor=whitesmoke|Chester-St. Margaret's
|
|Jacob Killawee3,55637.61%
||
|Danielle Barkhouse3,78840.06%
|
|Amy Stewart Reitsma1,62617.20%
|
|Jessica Alexander4174.41%
|
|Steven Foster680.72%
||
|Hugh MacKay†
|-
|bgcolor=whitesmoke|Lunenburg
|
|Suzanne Lohnes-Croft2,91534.55%
||
|Susan Corkum-Greek3,54442.01%
|
|Alison Smith1,75020.74%
|
|Thomas Trappenberg1712.03%
|
|John Giannakos570.68%
||
|Suzanne Lohnes-Croft
|-
|bgcolor=whitesmoke|Lunenburg West
|
|Jennifer Naugler3,19734.94%
||
|Becky Druhan4,06544.42%
|
|Merydie Ross1,70918.68%
|
|Eric Wade1801.97%
|
|
||
|Mark Furey†
|-
|bgcolor=whitesmoke|Queens
|
|Susan MacLeod1,05120.39%
||
|Kim Masland3,62770.37%
|
|Mary Dahr3236.27%
|
|Brian Muldoon1532.97%
|
|
||
|Kim MaslandQueens-Shelburne
|-
|bgcolor=whitesmoke|Shelburne
|
|Penny Smith1,48323.76%
||
|Nolan Young3,90562.56%
|
|Darren Stoddard75312.06%
|
|Steve Hirchak1011.62%
|
|
|
||New riding
|-
|bgcolor=whitesmoke|Yarmouth
||
|Zach Churchill4,34456.32%
|
|Candice Clairmont2,85637.03%
|
|SJ Rogers3224.17%
|
|Adam Randall1912.48%
|
|
||
|Zach Churchill
|}

Fundy-Northeast

|-
|bgcolor=whitesmoke|Colchester-Musquodoboit Valley
|
|Rhonda MacLellan1,91325.62%
||
|Larry Harrison4,11755.13%
|
|Janet Moulton1,43819.26%
|
|
|
|
|
|
||
|Larry Harrison
|-
|bgcolor=whitesmoke|Colchester North
|
|Merlyn Smith2,68131.84%
||
|Tom Taggart4,47753.18%
|
|Sean Foley95511.34%
|
|Ivan Drouin2522.99%
|
|Stephan Sante540.64%
|
|
||
|Karen Casey†
|-
|bgcolor=whitesmoke|Cumberland North
|
|Bill Casey2,48831.65%
|
|David Wightman5697.24%
|
|Lauren Skabar5697.24%
|
|
|
|
||
|Elizabeth Smith-McCrossin4,23553.87%
||
|Elizabeth Smith-McCrossin
|-
|bgcolor=whitesmoke|Cumberland South
|
|Rollie Lawless1,09219.17%
||
|Tory Rushton3,90068.47%
|
|Larry Duchesne5249.20%
|
|Nicholas Hendren1803.16%
|
|
|
|
||
|Tory Rushton
|-
|bgcolor=whitesmoke|Hants East
|
|Michael Blois3,23936.36%
||
|John A. MacDonald3,32837.36%
|
|Abby Cameron2,14224.05%
|
|Simon Greenough1992.23%
|
|
|
|
||
|Vacant
|-
|bgcolor=whitesmoke|Truro-Bible Hill-Millbrook-Salmon River
|
|Tamara Tynes Powell2,54130.21%
||
|Dave Ritcey4,02547.85%
|
|Darlene DeAdder1,39816.62%
|
|Shaun Trainor4485.33%
|
|
|
|
||
|Dave Ritcey
|}

Central Halifax

|-
|bgcolor=whitesmoke|Clayton Park West
||
|Rafah DiCostanzo3,60347.60%
|
|Nargis DeMolitor1,87524.77%
|
|Reena Davis1,83624.25%
|
|Richard Zurawski2102.77%
|
|Helen Lau460.61%
|
|
||
|Rafah DiCostanzo
|-
|bgcolor=whitesmoke|Fairview-Clayton Park
||
|Patricia Arab2,89238.51%
|
|Nicole Mosher1,67822.34%
|
|Joanne Hussey2,78737.11%
|
|Sheila Richardson1532.04%
|
|
|
|
||
|Patricia Arab
|-
|bgcolor=whitesmoke|Halifax Armdale
||
|Ali Duale3,07040.35%
|
|Richard MacLean1,68122.09%
|
|Julie Melanson2,59334.08%
|
|Jo-Ann Roberts2022.65%
|
|
|
|Stephen Chafe630.83%
||
|Lena Diab†
|-
|bgcolor=whitesmoke|Halifax Chebucto
|
|Jackie Kinley2,47832.14%
|
|John Wesley Chisholm91111.81%
||
|Gary Burrill4,00951.99%
|
|Lily Barraclough3134.06%
|
|
|
|
||
|Gary Burrill
|-
|bgcolor=whitesmoke|Halifax Citadel-Sable Island
|
|Labi Kousoulis2,95636.82%
|
|Sheri Morgan1,42517.75%
||
|Lisa Lachance3,39742.31%
|
|Noah Hollis2503.11%
|
|
|
|
||
|Labi Kousoulis
|-
|bgcolor=whitesmoke|Halifax Needham
|
|Colin Coady2,61729.07%
|
|Scott Ellis90410.04%
||
|Suzy Hansen5,30858.96%
|
|Kai Trappenberg1731.92%
|
|
|
|
||
|Lisa Roberts†
|}

Suburban Halifax

|-
|bgcolor=whitesmoke|Bedford Basin
||
|Kelly Regan3,70050.87%
|
|Nick Driscoll1,87425.76%
|
|Jacob Wilson1,55421.36%
|
|Madeline Taylor1462.01%
|
|
|
|
||
|Kelly Regan Bedford
|-
|bgcolor=whitesmoke|Bedford South
||
|Braedon Clark3,56845.37%
|
|Sura Hadad2,33829.73%
|
|David Paterson1,76322.42%
|
|Ron G. Parker1401.78%
|
|Alan Nightingale550.70%
|
|
|
|New riding
|-
|bgcolor=whitesmoke|Halifax Atlantic
||
|Brendan Maguire4,21355.22%
|
|Tim Cranston1,49319.57%
|
|Shauna Hatt1,74022.81%
|
|Sarah Weston1832.40%
|
|
|
|
||
|Brendan Maguire
|-
|bgcolor=whitesmoke|Hammonds Plains-Lucasville
||
|Ben Jessome3,69746.06%
|
|Julie Chaisson2,86535.70%
|
|Angela Downey1,33316.61%
|
|Mark Embrett1311.63%
|
|
|
|
||
|Ben Jessome
|-
|bgcolor=whitesmoke|Sackville-Cobequid
|
|Mary LeRoy1,70121.51%
||
|Steve Craig3,42643.33%
|
|Lara Fawthrop2,57732.59%
|
|Ian Dawson2032.57%
|
|
|
|
||
|Steve Craig
|-
|bgcolor=whitesmoke|Sackville-Uniacke
|
|Donalda MacIsaac2,32332.80%
||
|Brad Johns3,10443.82%
|
|Thomas Hill1,53521.67%
|
|Carson LeQuesne1211.71%
|
|
|
|
||
|Brad Johns Sackville-Beaver Bank
|-
|bgcolor=whitesmoke|Timberlea-Prospect
||
|Iain Rankin5,18154.38%
|
|Bill Healy2,32024.35%
|
|Raymond Theriault1,64717.29%
|
|Harry Ward2502.62%
|
|Dessire G. Miari400.42%
|
|Dawn Edith Penney900.94%
||
|Iain Rankin
|-
|bgcolor=whitesmoke|Waverley-Fall River-Beaver Bank
|
|Marni Tuttle3,54636.36%
||
|Brian Wong3,93840.38%
|
|Christina McCarron1,58116.21%
| 
|Anthony Edmonds6176.33%
|
|Shawn Whitford710.73%
|
|
||
|Bill Horne†
|}

Dartmouth/Cole Harbour/Eastern Shore

|-
|bgcolor=whitesmoke|Cole Harbour
||
|Tony Ince2,11839.75%
|
|Darryl Johnson1,70431.98%
|
|Jerome Lagmay1,43126.86%
|
|
|
|Chris Kinnie751.41%
||
|Tony Ince Cole Harbour-Portland Valley
|-
|bgcolor=whitesmoke|Cole Harbour-Dartmouth
||
|Lorelei Nicoll5,14452.24%
|
|Karina Sanford2,92929.75%
|
|Melody Pentland1,55815.82%
|
|Rana Zaman2152.18%
|
|
|
|New riding
|-
|bgcolor=whitesmoke|Dartmouth East
|
|D'Arcy Poultney2,90034.68%
||
|Tim Halman3,26038.99%
|
|Tyler J. Colbourne1,97423.61%
|
|Sara Adams1872.24%
|
|Chris Bowie410.49%
||
|Tim Halman
|-
|bgcolor=whitesmoke| Dartmouth North
|
|Pam Cooley2,36131.48%
|
|Lisa Coates1,27817.04%
||
|Susan Leblanc3,73149.75%
|
|Carolyn Marshall1291.72%
|
|
||
|Susan Leblanc
|-
|bgcolor=whitesmoke|Dartmouth South
|
|Lesley MacKay1,60322.14%
|
|Chris Curtis1,26217.43%
||
|Claudia Chender4,20958.13%
|
|Skylar Martini1672.31%
|
|
||
|Claudia Chender
|-
|bgcolor=whitesmoke|Eastern Passage
|
|Joyce Treen1,44426.21%
||
|Barbara Adams2,46944.82%
|
|Tammy Jakeman1,22222.18%
|
|Corey Myers3746.79%
|
|
||
|Barbara Adams Cole Harbour-Eastern Passage
|-
|bgcolor=whitesmoke|Eastern Shore
|
|Kevin Murphy3,16934.06%
||
|Kent Smith4,26445.82%
|
|Deirdre Dwyer1,61817.39%
|
|Cheryl Atkinson2542.73%
|
|
||
|Kevin Murphy
|-
|bgcolor=whitesmoke|Preston
||
|Angela Simmonds2,22643.38%
|
|Archy Beals1,47228.69%
|
|Colter C.C. Simmonds1,43327.93%
|
|
|
|
||
|Keith Colwell† Preston-Dartmouth
|}

Central Nova

|-
|bgcolor=whitesmoke|Antigonish
|
|Randy Delorey2,99731.82%
||
|Michelle Thompson4,70749.98%
|
|Moraig MacGillivray1,55216.48%
|
|Will Fraser1281.36%
|
|Ryan Smyth340.36%
|
|
||
|Randy Delorey
|-
|bgcolor=whitesmoke|Guysborough-Tracadie
|
|Lloyd Hines1,57130.35%
||
|Greg Morrow3,28163.39%
|
|Matt Stickland2474.77%
|
|Gabe Bruce771.49%
|
|
|
|
||
|Lloyd HinesGuysborough-Eastern Shore-Tracadie
|-
|bgcolor=whitesmoke|Pictou Centre
|
|Jim McKenna2,26930.93%
||
|Pat Dunn4,09255.77%
|
|Vernon Theriault86211.75%
|
|Laura Moore1141.55%
|
|
|
|
||
|Pat Dunn
|-
|bgcolor=whitesmoke|Pictou East
|
|Joe MacDonald1,58522.46%
||
|Tim Houston4,91869.68%
|
|Joy Polley5007.08%
|
|
|
|Jonathan Geoffrey Dean550.78%
|
|
||
|Tim Houston
|-
|bgcolor=whitesmoke|Pictou West
|
|Mary Wooldridge-Elliott1,51021.41%
||
|Karla MacFarlane4,48763.62%
|
|Rick Parker87212.36%
|
|Clare Brett1241.76%
|
|
|
|John A. Clark600.85%
||
|Karla MacFarlane
|}

Cape Breton

|-
|bgcolor=whitesmoke|Cape Breton Centre-Whitney Pier
|
|Michelle Wilson3,18840.61%
|
|Bryden Mombourquette1,28116.32%
||
|Kendra Coombes3,30942.15%
|
|Robert Hussey720.92%
|
|
||
|Kendra CoombesCape Breton Centre
|-
|bgcolor=whitesmoke|Cape Breton East
|
|Heather Peters3,09436.73%
||
|Brian Comer3,89746.27%
|
|Barbara Beaton1,43217.00%
|
|
|
|
||
|Brian ComerSydney River-Mira-Louisbourg
|-
|bgcolor=whitesmoke|Glace Bay-Dominion
|
|John John McCarthy2,47931.15%
||
|John White2,75434.61%
|
|John Morgan2,72534.24%
|
|
|
|
||
|Geoff MacLellan† Glace Bay
|-
|bgcolor=whitesmoke|Inverness
|
|Damian MacInnis3,11235.96%
||
|Allan MacMaster4,83355.85%
|
|Joanna Clark7088.18%
|
|
|
|
||
|Allan MacMaster
|-
|bgcolor=whitesmoke|Northside-Westmount
||
|Fred Tilley4,03046.86%
|
|Murray Ryan3,14036.51%
|
|Jennifer Morrison1,43016.63%
|
|
|
|
||
|Murray Ryan
|-
|bgcolor=whitesmoke|Richmond
|
|Matt Haley2,00936.85%
||
|Trevor Boudreau2,77350.86%
|
|Bryson Syliboy2745.03%
|
|
|
|Alana Paon3967.26%
||
|Alana PaonCape Breton-Richmond
|-
|bgcolor=whitesmoke|Sydney-Membertou
||
|Derek Mombourquette4,56154.27%
|
|Pauline Singer1,46717.45%
|
|Madonna Doucette2,37728.28%
|
|
|
|
||
|Derek MombourquetteSydney-Whitney Pier
|-
|bgcolor=whitesmoke|Victoria-The Lakes
|
|Nadine Bernard2,22434.20%
||
|Keith Bain3,53654.37%
|
|Adrianna MacKinnon6279.64%
|
|
|
|Stemer MacLeod1161.78%
||
|Keith Bain
|}

Opinion polls
Voting intentions in Nova Scotia since the 2017 election

References

2021
Election
2021 elections in Canada
August 2021 events in Canada